Iain Aitch is an English writer, journalist and artist who lives in London.

He is the author of the travel book A Fête Worse Than Death, a humorous first person journey through an English summer, and We're British, Innit, a humorous lexicon about Britain. He has contributed to at least ten more titles.

He writes articles for The Guardian and The Daily Telegraph and has also written for a diverse selection of magazines, including Dwell, Bizarre, Dazed and The Idler.

Aitch was born in Margate, Kent and has written extensively about the area and its people. In 2011, he undertook a residency with the newly opened Turner Contemporary gallery, creating a photographic exhibit that was shown in the Margate gallery's Nothing in the World But Youth show and featured in its exhibition catalogue.

References

External links
Iain Aitch's website
Extracts from We're British, Innit in the Independent newspaper
Interview with Shangri-Las singer Mary Weiss in Daily Telegraph
Iain Aitch learns to dance: A Guardian readers' article of the year

Year of birth missing (living people)
Living people
English male journalists
English travel writers
People from Margate